Gratiola amphiantha is a rare species of flowering plant known by the common names little amphianthus, pool sprite and snorkelwort. It was previously the only species in the monotypic genus Amphianthus, but it was moved to genus Gratiola after genetic analysis in 2008. It is native to the Piedmont region of the southeastern United States, with a center of distribution in Georgia. It occurs in Alabama and South Carolina as well. It is limited to granite outcrops, a high-biodiversity habitat type that is threatened by activities such as quarrying, off-road vehicles, and trash and debris dumping. It is a federally listed threatened species.

Gratiola amphiantha is a petite aquatic plant which occurs in the non-Mediterranean climate vernal pools that sometimes form in the granite outcrop habitat. It is a delicate annual herb a few centimeter long with a short, threadlike stem surrounded by a rosette of tiny lance-shaped submerged leaves. Above them are a pair of slightly larger, floating leaves which are oval in shape and up to 8 millimeters (0.3 inches) long. Flowers occur in the axils of both submerged and floating leaves. Those occurring underwater are cleistogamous and do not open, and those blooming on the water's surface have open five-lobed white corollas a few millimeters long. It is a fast-growing species, germinating immediately with sufficient rain and maturing to flower in 17 days. Its life cycle is quick because appropriate growing conditions occur for only a brief time at these pools.

There are few other plants that grow in the vernal pools of the outcrops, except for local endemic species of Isoetes, such as Isoetes piedmontana.

Recent estimates have the number of populations around 31, and certain local populations can be quite large, with several thousand plants occupying pools and puddles in outcrop habitat in wet years. However, many granite outcrops are consumed for quarrying in the area, and this is likely the greatest threat to the species. Livestock grazing near some pools has caused eutrophication of the water, making it inhospitable for the plant.

The oldest name for the species is Amphianthus pusillus, coined in 1837. D.Estes & R.L.Small wanted to transfer the species to Gratiola, but could not call it Gratiola pusilla because Willdenow had already used this name for another species. Hence the replacement name, Gratiola amphiantha.

References

External links

amphiantha
Plants described in 1837
Flora of the Southeastern United States